Schillings is a surname. Notable people with the surname include:

 Benoit Schillings, Belgian software engineer
 Max von Schillings (1868–1933), German conductor, composer, and theatre director